Juan Carlos Rojas Guerra (born 6 June 1984) is a Mexican professional footballer who plays as a right-back.

Rojas played a bulk of his professional career with Club León in the Primera Division A. He eventually made his way onto the big stage with Pachuca for the Apertura 2008 tournament.

He is known to teammates and fans as "Romita" for his birthplace.

Honours

Club
León:
 Primera División A: Clausura 2008

FC Juárez:
 Ascenso MX: Apertura 2015

References

External links 
 Profile at Ascenso MX
 
 Profile at BDFA

1984 births
Living people
C.F. Pachuca players
Club León footballers
Chiapas F.C. footballers
FC Juárez footballers
Liga MX players
Footballers from Guanajuato
Mexican footballers
Association football defenders